Ján Kubica (born June 17, 1973, in Trenčín) is a Slovak sprint canoer who competed from the mid-1990s to the early 2000s (decade). At the 1996 Summer Olympics in Atlanta, he was eliminated in the semifinals of the C-1 1000 m event. four years later in Sydney, Kubica was eliminated in the semifinals of both the C-2 500 m and the C-2 1000 m events.

References
 Sports-Reference.com profile

1973 births
Canoeists at the 1996 Summer Olympics
Canoeists at the 2000 Summer Olympics
Living people
Olympic canoeists of Slovakia
Slovak male canoeists
Sportspeople from Trenčín